Cebreros Station (also known as DSA 2 or Deep Space Antenna 2) is a European Space Agency, ESTRACK radio antenna station for communication with spacecraft, located about 10 km east of Cebreros and 90 km from Madrid, Spain, operated by the European Space Operations Centre and INTA. A 35-metre diameter antenna that receives and transmit in X- and Ka-bands is located at the site. Station code is "CEB". 20 kW CW High Power Amplifier (HPA) it was created by Rheinmetall Italia SpA (Italy). The monitoring and control system was implemented by Microsis srl (Italy).

It provides daily support to Lisa Pathfinder, Mars Express and Gaia.

It also provided support for Rosetta.

Two sister stations are New Norcia Station in Australia, and Malargüe Station in Argentina.

Until 2002, ESA lacked its own means to communicate with ships destined to other planets, or in very distant orbits and depended on NASA's network of listeners to receive the data collected by them.

Description

The mobile dish of the antenna is 35 meters in diameter. The entire structure measures 40 meters in height and weighs 620 tons. The foundations begin at 20 meters deep. Much of the machinery responsible for moving the antenna is underground.

It has more data acquisition capacity than the New Norcia antenna, since it receives and transmits information in the Ka band (31.8 - 32.3 GHz) as well as reception in the X band. Its target has an error of only six millidegrees (which is ten times more accurate than the usual monitoring antennas of 15 meters in diameter). It has 250 temperature sensors distributed throughout the structure, so that it can auto-adjust automatically in case of expansion and contraction of the material due to meteorological changes. With respect to the New Norcia antenna, it is also faster in azimuth and elevation, and is able to withstand a more intense wind.

Usually, the antenna is operated remotely from the European Space Operations Center (ESOC) located in Darmstadt (Germany).

Site

The station is located in a very quiet location, surrounded by pine and rockrose. Apart from its privileged situation, the choice fell on Cebreros because it has the necessary geographical coordinates (120 degrees east or west of the Nueva Norcia station) and the lack of radioelectric interference produced by mobile telephony.

At first, the option of Villafranca del Castillo (Madrid) was considered, where ESA already has a Space Astronomy Center (ESAC), but it was discarded due to its accelerated urban development, which would have been, without a doubt, a safe source of interference. Another argument in favor of Cebreros was to have the facilities that NASA used in the 1960s and 1970s to monitor the Apollo spacecraft. NASA abandoned the use of this station in 1983 for budgetary reasons and ceded the facilities to the Spanish government.

Construction 
The search for the site for the Cebreros station began in April 2002, although construction did not start until January 2003. It lasted a little over two years (it ended in August 2005, and since then it has been running on tests) .The construction was the responsibility of a consortium led by the companies SED Systems (Canada) and by Vertex Antennentechnik (Germany). The Spanish companies ESTEYCO and NECSO were responsible for the infrastructure of the antenna tower, while LV Salamanca was responsible for the infrastructure and the remodeling of the building.

The cost of Cebreros station has been about 30 million euros, of which 22 have been for the antenna. The first director was Spanish Valeriano Claros.

Missions 
It covered interplanetary missions, such as the Rosetta space probe, sent into space in 2004 to land for the first time on a comet, the Churyumov-Gerasimenko, after a ten-year star voyage, and the routine operations of the Venus Express mission, and is used currently as support for the Mars Express. The station participates in missions as BepiColombo, Herschel, Planck, LISA Pathfinder and Gaia space telescopes.

References

External links
 ESA webpage on ESTRACK, including links to all stations
 ESA/ESTRACK Cebreros station page
 Cebreros Station live webcam

European Space Agency
ESTRACK facilities
Earth stations in Spain
Buildings and structures in the Community of Madrid
INTA facilities
2005 establishments in Spain
Buildings and structures completed in 2005